The A-3174 (LRS-1200) was a model of 1,200 hp (895 kW) B-B diesel locomotive built by Lima-Hamilton in 1950. All sixteen units were built for the New York Central. A second order of 17 was outstanding at the time of Lima-Hamilton's merger with the Baldwin Locomotive Works, but owing to insufficient time to build the locomotives before the locomotive production ceased at Lima, NYC agreed to receive RS-12s from BLH, they were built at Eddystone, PA.

Lima-Hamilton never assigned a model number to their models, but instead referred to them by specification numbers. Model designations such as LRS-1200 were a railfan invention. Lima-Hamilton assigned A-3174 as the specification number for this particular model.

Most of these locomotives were retired in the mid-1960's, although two remained in service into the Penn Central era. The surviving units, 8062 and 8063, were rebuilt to replace their original Lima prime movers with EMD V12 567C engines, like those in SW1200s and E8's. They were renumbered 8398-8399 in 1972 to make way for the new GP38-2's PC ordered, which were to be numbered 7940-8162. PC 8399 was retired in November 1974, and PC 8398 was retired in February 1975. No LRS-1200s survive today.

References 

 

 Reid, Robert H. (Ed.). (March 1 1974). Penn Central Diesel Spotter's Guide. yumpu.com. Retrieved January 1, 2023, from https://www.yumpu.com/s/9aeKaGqhvVbSHWeX

 Penn Central Motive Power Summary. The Diesel Shop. Retrieved January 1, 2023, from https://thedieselshop.us/PennCentral.HTML

B-B locomotives
Railway locomotives introduced in 1950
LRS-1200
New York Central Railroad locomotives